Rosay-sur-Lieure is a commune in the Eure department in north-western France.

Population

See also
Communes of the Eure department

References

External links

Communes of Eure